Guy I of Luxembourg-Ligny (1340 – 23 August 1371) was Count of Saint-Pol (1360–1371) and Count of Ligny, Lord of Roussy and Beauvoir (1364–1371).

He was the son of John I and Alix of Dampierre, dame de Richebourg.

Guy participated in the Battle of Baesweiler (present-day Germany), a conflict between his relative Wenceslaus I of Luxembourg, husband of the Duchess of Brabant on the one side, and William II, Duke of Jülich and Edward, Duke of Guelders on the other side.
The chronicler Jan van Boendale writes in his Brabantsche Yeesten that Guy lay wounded and abandoned on the battlefield, until he was discovered by a scavenger the next day, who killed and robbed him. When this plunderer tried later to sell his booty, he was hanged.

Marriage and children 
In 1354 he married Mahaut de Châtillon (1335–1378), Countess of Saint-Pol, daughter of Jean de Châtillon-Saint-Pol and Jeanne de Fiennes, and had:
 Waleran III (1356–1415), Count of Ligny and of  Saint-Pol
 Pierre (1369–1387), bishop of Metz and cardinal, beatified in 1527
 Margaret, married in 1377 Peter of Enghien, died in 1384, and in 1396 with Jean III de Werchin et Cysoing, died at the Battle of Agincourt
 John of Luxembourg, Lord of Beauvoir (1370–1397), married Margaret, Countess of Brienne. He started a cadet branch of the House of Saint-Pol and was the father of Peter of Luxembourg, Count of Saint-Pol and John II of Luxembourg, Count of Ligny.
 André (died 1396), Bishop of Cambrai
 Marie, married Jean de Condé (died 1391), and Simon, count of Salm (died 1397)
 Joan, Countess of Ligny (died 1430)

Ancestors

References

French people of Luxembourgian descent
Counts of Ligny
Counts of Saint-Pol
1340 births
1371 deaths